The Yamaha TDM 900 is a 2-cylinder engine sport touring motorcycle produced by Yamaha Motor Company between 2002 and 2011. It was the third and last generation fabricated for the TDM series.

History 
Product planner Hennes Fischer remembers: "It all started back in the beginning of the nineties, when we wanted to create a bike, which would be ultimate fun on bumpy small roads. Most of us loved touring trips using tiny alpine pass roads. But most bikes at that time either needed full concentration on these small roads or simply could not cope with the constantly changing surface properly. Something in between a big Enduro and a streetbike seemed ideal for this purpose. "The answer was TDM 850 launched in 1992. The bike instantly hit the heart of the French bikers, who were already customizing their Enduros with street tyres and better brakes. In the years to come TDM convinced the motorcyclists all over Europe of its benefits. Yamaha product planners often hear sentences like : "TDM is many bikes in one: a sportsbike on small roads, a tourer on longer trips and a powerful commuter in city traffic."

Even completely new, the unmistakable face of the TDM remained

In 1996 TDM saw major changes with a new engine and many chassis modification and a new face. The new styling attracted many new customers, and the bike became also very popular in the styling-sensitive Italian market. For 2002, the TDM is completely revised again. Sven Ermstrang, Product Planning manager in Yamaha Europe: "We want to take a long-term approach to our model development for the European market. That means sensible model changes, with real benefits for the customers: not changing for change's sake."

Design philosophy 
He continues "That is why the TDM850, throughout its life, has remained essentially the same bike. It did have step-by-step improvements through the years, so that at 10 years of age, is still an excellent bike. It does not feel old since its function is very well up to date. Following our long-term vision, we wanted to make the new 900 version fit for the next 10 years by preserving all the good points and bring the bike to a higher level overall!"

Etsuo Matsuki, Project Leader of the new TDM 900 says: "Personally I love riding on mountain roads and I also love machines powered by a twin engine. As a fan of big bikes, I had a burning desire to build this third generation TDM. The image we had in mind during our development was a machine perfected for pass roads when touring in the Alps or Pyrenees for example."

Takuya Mochizuki, Product Planner adds: "I believe the new TDM represents the technological advantages and developments that have taken place over the last 10 years. Though the concept is the same than 10 years ago, the TDM 900 is a completely new machine from tip to toe."

Characteristics

Engine 
The most obvious change is the increased displacement, resulting in more power @ 7,500 rpm and torque  @ 7,500 rpm). In combination with fuel injection the new engine pulls TDM much stronger. It is a pleasure to accelerate out of tiny hairpin corners and feel the mighty twin's power resulting in forward propulsion. In the past TDM riders commented that the gearbox was a bit loud and harsh. That has been taken seriously and a totally new, 6 speed gearbox has been developed. It shifts smoothly and when in last gear, the bike runs on lower rpm and higher speed comfortably on highway sections.

Innovation: adjustable air induct and fuel injection strengthen the parallel twin character

Etsuo Matsuki and his team developed another interesting feature to increase TDM engine torque and power: A variable intake duct effectively brings out the full potential of the new injection system. The air cleaner box will automatically adjust the air intake volume in accordance with engine rpm. Below 4000rpm the duct closes down about one-third of the intake area. The result is amazing: when suddenly opening the throttle, the new 900 twin pulls stronger than ever without any hesitation. And with the help of the injection system even on high mountain roads (up to 3000 meters!) the fuel mixture is always adjusted properly. Riders who use their bike often on higher altitude, will fully understand and appreciate these benefits. A 3-way catalytic converter is standard and reduces emissions effectively in the background.

The new aluminium frame is 6 kg lighter and increased 40% in torsional stiffness.

Chassis 
To improve the handling character, the engineers reduced weight in every possible area of the bike. The steel frame was replaced by a newly designed aluminium construction, which does not only have higher stiffness but also 6 kg of weight less at the same time. In combination with the rigid mounted new engine the torsional stiffness increased by 40%.

As a result, the new TDM 900 feels more like a street bike when it comes down to pointing a line around corners. In particular in fast corners at higher speed the bike shows increased precision in following the riders input through the handlebars, which is transmitted by wider radial tyres on both front and rear YZF-R6 lightweight wheels. On the other hand, the long suspension stroke and setting still ensures a pleasant absorption of bumps, making the bike a first choice for critical surface conditions.

The increased steering accuracy is also a result of the improved weight distribution. The 30° mounting angle (instead of 40° on previous TDM) of engine and cylinders and other dimension changes enabled the engineers to achieve a favourable weight distribution of 47% to 49,8% on the front wheel. Project leader Etsuo Matsuki also utilized knowledge from development of supersport machines. The longer rear swingarm with a YZF-R1 piggy-back rear suspension contributes to stability and accuracy. Yamaha's well known MOS 64 opposed piston one-piece callipers will withstand the toughest downhill pass road ride. even with a passenger on the back and a tank bag in front of you.

Differences between the TDM850 
Comfort is part of the TDM concept. The new body shape incorporates the rider in a slightly more forward position to give them a better direct control feeling of the front end. The designers however took great care at the same time to leave plenty of freedom for the rider to find the most suitable position for themself.

Even though the new bike has a complete new body shape, it still is a TDM. Takeshi Umemoto from GK Dynamics was responsible for the new looks and believes: "TDM is simply TDM; an entity in itself. We knew an important point would be to carry on that TDM identity. So during the development we attempted to create a design that introduced new creative forms within the basic context."

In the past decade some 62.000 motorcyclists all across Europe have chosen a Yamaha TDM850. The new bike now starts a new decade of TDM fun, incorporating all the experience we gained in these past 10 years, not only by internal testing, but also through talking to many TDM owners and listening to their wishes and comments.

References

External links 
 

TDM 900